Potarophytum is a group of plants in the family Rapateaceae described as a genus in 1939.

The only known species is Potarophytum riparium, endemic to the Kaieteur National Park in the Potaro-Siparuni region of Guyana.

References

Monotypic Poales genera
Rapateaceae
Endemic flora of Guyana